Ron Riley (born July 20, 1948) is a Canadian former professional ice hockey player.

During the 1972–73 season, Riley played 22 games in the World Hockey Association with the Ottawa Nationals.

References

External links

1948 births
Living people
Anglophone Quebec people
Canadian expatriate ice hockey players in the United States
Canadian ice hockey left wingers
Clinton Comets players
Ottawa Nationals players
Ice hockey people from Montreal